Heartburn Hotel is a British sitcom that ran for two series on BBC One from 1998 to 2000.

The programme concerns the owner-operator and tenants of the Olympic Hotel—an establishment named in anticipation of a successful Olympic bid by the UK. Each series is six episodes long; one special aired in December 1998. Heartburn Hotel was written by John Sullivan and Steve Glover; it starred Tim Healy as the hotel's proprietor.

The first series premiered on BBC One at 10 PM on 20 July 1998. The second series aired from 23 June to 28 July 2000, at a 10:20 PM time slot.

Characters
Harry Springer and Duggie Strachan are the main protagonists in the comedy. After both characters were involved in the Falklands conflict they both move back to Birmingham, Harry to own the Olympic Hotel and Duggie to become a teacher.
These two characters take opposing viewpoints in almost every matter and although Harry pretends to sympathise with his customers, his views are radically right wing as opposed to Duggie who emphatically empathises due to his own plight brought about by his gambling addiction. The reason Duggie accepts his landlords overbearing boorishness dates back to the Falklands whereupon Harry saved his life, a fact that Harry does not let Duggie forget. Other characters include Baker (Kim Wall), Morgan (Ifan Huw Daffyd) and Scouse (Stephen Aintree).

Episodes

References

External links
 

1990s British sitcoms
2000s British sitcoms
1998 British television series debuts
2000 British television series endings
BBC television sitcoms
Television series produced at Pinewood Studios
Television series set in hotels